The tribe Exostyleae is an early-branching monophyletic clade of the flowering plant subfamily Faboideae (or Papilionaceae) that are mostly found in Neotropical rainforests.

Description
This clade is composed of 6 genera, most of which were traditionally assigned to the tribe Swartzieae. However, recent molecular phylogenetic analyses circumscribed these six genera into a strongly supported monophyletic clade. Synapomorphic traits that unite the members of this clade include non-papilionate flowers, "serrate and sometimes spinescent leaflet or leaf margins, standard position variable in the floral bud, basifixed anthers, and drupaceous fruits". They are also united by wood anatomy, sharing an "uncommon presence of crystals in ray cells", and floral ontogeny, sharing "unidirectional initiation of five sepals, simultaneous initiation of petals, and[…]unusual antepetalous stamens initiating before the antesepalous ones."

Genera
 Exostyles Schott
 Harleyodendron R. S. Cowan
 Holocalyx Micheli
 Lecointea Ducke.
 Uribea Dugand & Romero
 Zollernia Wied-Neuw. & Nees

References

 
Faboideae